The Leo Baeck Medal has been awarded since 1978 by the Leo Baeck Institute of New York City, an international research institute devoted to the study of the history and culture of German-speaking Jewry. It is the highest recognition the Institute bestows upon those who have helped preserve the spirit of German-speaking Jewry in culture, academia, politics, and philanthropy. 

On the front of the medal is an image of Rabbi Leo Baeck, and the words, "Leader of German Jewry." On the back are the words "so that the memory of a great past may not perish."

Recipients

 1978 – Axel Springer, publisher, founder of Axel Springer
 1980 – Fred Lessing, chairman and treasurer of Leo Baeck Institut New York
 1995 – Fred Grubel, vice president of Leo Baeck Institut New York
 1996 – Ernst Cramer, German-born American publisher, chairman of Axel Springer
 1997 – Helmut Sonnenfeldt, German-born American political advisor, member of US National Security Council 
 1998 – George Mosse, German-born American history professor 
 1999 – W. Michael Blumenthal, German-born American director of Jewish Museum Berlin
 2000 – Edgar Bronfman, Sr., businessman, president of the World Jewish Congress
 2001 – Johannes Rau, President of Germany 
 2002 – Ruth Westheimer (Dr. Ruth), German-American sex therapist, talk show host, author, professor, Holocaust survivor, and former Haganah sniper.
 2003 – Daniel Libeskind, architect
 2004 – Fritz Stern, German-born American historian
 2005 – Otto Schily, German Minister of the Interior 
 2006 – James Wolfensohn, lawyer, banker, economist, and President of the World Bank
 2007 – Mathias Döpfner, journalist, CEO of Axel Springer
 2008 – Wolfgang Ischinger, German ambassador to the UK and USA
 2009 – Joschka Fischer, Foreign Minister of Germany
 2010 – Angela Merkel, Chancellor of Germany
 2010 – Kurt Masur, conductor
 2011 – Anselm Kiefer, painter and sculptor
 2012 – Margarethe von Trotta, film director
 2013 – Stuart Eizenstat, ambassador, U.S. Special Advisor for Holocaust Issues
 2014 – Joachim Gauck, President of Germany
 2015 – Ismar Schorsch, German-born American President Emeritus of the Leo Baeck Institut
 2016 – Robert Morgenthau, lawyer, District Attorney for New York County
 2017 – Max M. Warburg Jr., German-born American banker
 2018 – Peter Wittig, German ambassador to the UK and USA, and wife Huberta von Voss-Wittig
 2019 – Martha Minow, Dean of Harvard Law School
 2021 – Frank-Walter Steinmeier, President of Germany
 2022 – Amy Gutmann, United States ambassador to Germany

Distinction
The similarly named Leo Baeck Preis of the Central Council of Jews in Germany is to be distinguished from this medal.

References

External links
Leo Baeck Institute

Alms in Judaism
Awards established in 1978
Ashkenazi Jewish culture in Germany
German-Jewish culture in Germany
German-Jewish diaspora
Jewish culture
Jewish education in Germany
Jewish German history
Jews and Judaism in Germany
Language-related awards
Leo Baeck Institute
Politics awards
Religion-related awards